The rufous-breasted wood quail (Odontophorus speciosus) is a species of bird in the family Odontophoridae. It is found in Bolivia, Ecuador, and Peru primarily on the east side of the Andes between 800 and 2000m in elevation (higher in Peru).

Its natural habitat is subtropical or tropical moist montane forests.

It has been listed as least concern.

Feeding 
The Rufous-breasted wood quail eats insects and nuts especially in summer, as well as plants. Unlike many other bird species, they require a high protein diet.

Subspecies 

 O. s. soderstromii Lönnberg & Rendahl, 1922 – extreme S Colombia (SE Nariño) and E & S Ecuador.
 O. s. speciosus Tschudi, 1843 – N & C Peru (Amazonas S to Ayacucho).
 O. s. loricatus Todd, 1932 – SE Peru (Cuzco) to Bolivia (E to Santa Cruz).

References

rufous-breasted wood quail
Birds of the Ecuadorian Andes
Birds of the Peruvian Andes
Birds of the Bolivian Andes
rufous-breasted wood quail
Taxonomy articles created by Polbot